Firecracker People is the second full-length album by Hotel Lights, released on August 19, 2008 on Bar/None Records.

Track listing
"Blue Always Finds Me" – 4:26
"Dream State Flying" – 3:47
"Down" – 3:30
"Flicker in My Eye" – 3:43
"Amelia Bright" – 4:05
"Firecracker People" – 5:06
"Norina" – 3:40
"Wedding Day" – 2:19
"Chemical Clouds" – 4:03
"Nobody Let You Down" – 3:35
"Your Choices" – 5:03
"Run Away Happy" – 4:24

Personnel
Darren Jessee – Guitar, Piano, vocals
 Alan Weatherhead - Guitar
 Zeke Hutchins – drums
 Jay Brown – bass

References

2008 albums